Junnanotrechus is a genus of beetle in the family Carabidae that was first described by Uéno & Yin in 1993.

Species 
Junnanotrechus contains the following nine species:

 Junnanotrechus baehri Deuve, 2013
 Junnanotrechus elegantulus Belousov & Kabak, 2014
 Junnanotrechus exophtalmus Deuve, 1998
 Junnanotrechus koroleviellus Belousov & Kabak, 2014
 Junnanotrechus microps Uéno & Yin, 1993
 Junnanotrechus oblongus Belousov & Kabak, 2014
 Junnanotrechus schuelkei Belousov & Kabak, 2014
 Junnanotrechus triporus Belousov & Kabak, 2014
 Junnanotrechus wrasei Belousov & Kabak, 2014

References

Trechinae